"Se La" is a track from Lionel Richie's 1986 album Dancing on the Ceiling.  The song was written by Richie and Greg Phillinganes, and produced by Richie and James Anthony Carmichael. Released in 1987 as the final single from the album, it would be Richie's last single of the 1980s.

Track listing
7" single
"Se La"  – 4:20
"Serves You Right"  – 4:52

12" single / CD Single
"Se La"  – 8:12
"Se La"  – 4:20
"Serves You Right"  – 4:52
Note: track 1 remixed by Steve Thompson and Michael Barbiero

Charts

Weekly charts

Year-end charts

References

External links
 

1987 singles
Lionel Richie songs
Songs written by Lionel Richie
Songs written by Greg Phillinganes
1986 songs
Motown singles
Song recordings produced by James Anthony Carmichael